Aberdare was a constituency in the Parliament of the United Kingdom. It was created for the 1918 general election and returned one Member of Parliament (MP) by the first past the post system until it was abolished for the 1983 general election. The Labour Party gained the seat in 1922 and held it comfortably until its abolition.

Boundaries and name
The constituency consisted of the two neighbouring towns of Aberdare and Mountain Ash in Glamorgan, Wales. When the seat was abolished in 1983, it was largely replaced by the Cynon Valley seat.

1918–1950
Under the Representation of the People Act 1918, the existing parliamentary borough of Merthyr Tydfil was divided into two single-member constituencies. One of these was Merthyr Tydfil, Aberdare Division, which consisted of the two urban districts of Aberdare and Mountain Ash.

1950–1983
The Representation of the People Act 1948 reorganised constituencies throughout Great Britain, and introduced the term "borough constituency" in place of "parliamentary borough". The duly renamed Aberdare Borough Constituency was again defined as consisting of the Aberdare and Mountain Ash urban districts. The renamed constituency was first contested at the 1950 general election. It was unchanged at the next revision of constituencies in 1970, continuing with the same name and boundaries until its abolition in 1983.

Members of Parliament

History
The first member for Aberdare was Charles Stanton, Stanton was a militant miners' agent in the pre-1914 era but had become an equally fierce proponent of the war effort which brought him into conflict with former colleagues including Keir Hardie. Stanton was elected to succeed Hardie as member for Merthyr Boroughs at a by-election in 1915 and comfortably won the Aberdare constituency at the 1918 Coupon Election.

By 1922, Stanton's appeal and popularity had faded and he was defeated by George Hall, who held the seat for over twenty years.

Labour's hold on Aberdare was never threatened thereafter although Plaid Cymru did make a strong showing at the 1970 general election. Glyn Owen, the new Plaid Cymru candidate in 1974, sustained the campaign from 1970 but this did not seriously threaten the new Labour candidate, Ioan Evans, at the second election that year.

Elections

Elections in the 1910s

Elections in the 1920s

Elections in the 1930s

Elections in the 1940s

Elections in the 1950s 

N.B. Changes in 1950 are from the 1945 election and not the 1946 by-election.

Elections in the 1960s

Elections in the 1970s

References

Historic parliamentary constituencies in South Wales
History of Glamorgan
Constituencies of the Parliament of the United Kingdom established in 1918
Constituencies of the Parliament of the United Kingdom disestablished in 1983
Aberdare